The Ordnance QF 2-pounder (QF denoting "quick firing"), or simply "2 pounder gun", was a  British anti-tank gun and vehicle-mounted gun employed in the Second World War.

It was the main anti-tank weapon of the artillery units in the Battle of France and, due to the need to rearm quickly after the Dunkirk evacuation, remained in service during the North African campaign. In its vehicle-mounted variant the 2-pounder was a common main gun on British tanks early in World War II, as well as being a typical main armament of armoured cars, such as the Daimler, throughout the war. As the armour protection of Axis tanks improved, the 2-pounder lost effectiveness and it was gradually replaced by the 57 mm QF 6-pounder starting in 1942. It equipped infantry battalion anti-tank platoons replacing their anti-tank rifles until in turn replaced by 6-pounders but remained in service until the end of the war.

This QF 2-pounder was distinctly different from the QF 2 pounder "pom-pom" gun  naval anti-aircraft gun used by the Royal Navy which was a 40 mm autocannon.

History
The gun was developed as both a tank weapon and an anti-tank gun. For reasons of economy and standardization, it was accepted - as the 2-pdr Mark IX - for both purposes in October 1935. Carriages for the gun were designed by Vickers and the Design Department at the Woolwich Arsenal.

Vickers was the first to submit a design, which was accepted as the Ordnance QF 2-pounder Mark IX on Carriage Mark I. A limited number of pieces were built in 1936. The carriage had an innovative three-legged construction. In the travelling position, one of the legs was used as a towing trail, and the other two were folded. When the gun was positioned for combat, the legs were emplaced on the ground and the wheels were lifted up. Woolwich Arsenal had continued to develop their carriage and when re-examined was seen to be superior to Vickers design, and with this carriage the gun was adopted as Ordnance QF 2-pounder Mark IX on Carriage Mark II. It was conceptually similar, although when the gun was emplaced for combat the wheels had to be removed. This carriage was also manufactured by Vickers.

The unusual construction gave the gun good stability and a traverse of 360 degrees, allowing it to quickly engage moving vehicles from any approach. The gunner had handwheels for traverse and elevation, additionally he could disengage the traverse mechanism and the gun commander could rotate the gun be pushing against the gunners shoulders aided by a simple ring and bead sight on the top of the shield. The gunner also had a notch and bead sight above the telescopic

With the Vickers carriage, the gun could also be fired from its wheels, at the expense of limited traverse. The shield was 5/16 inch armour plate. Typically it was towed by a 15-cwt (3/4-ton) truck with 68 rounds on the truck with a further 14 on the carriage itself. It could also be carried "portee" on a 30-cwt truck.

The 40 mm 2-pounder could outperform a typical 37 mm piece, such as the German 3.7 cm PaK 36 or the Bofors 37 mm, and significantly outclassed 25mm and 20mm weapons of that era. A drawback of the 2-pounder was that it was nearly twice as heavy as the PaK 36 and had a higher profile.

The gun was first put into use on a tank as the main armament of the Vickers-designed Cruiser Tank Mk I.

A late-war project was the Canadian David High Velocity to allow 2-pdr ammunition to be fired from the larger-calibre 6-pdr. This was intended to improve the muzzle velocity of the shot. Initial trials carried out in Canada and the U.K. were promising;  however the system was still being developed when the war ended, and the program was subsequently ended along with it.

Another development was the 2-pdr HV 'Pipsqueak', a postwar gun using a 40x438R cartridge originally intended as the main armament for the Saladin armoured car that was to replace the AEC Armoured Car. This was designed to fire Armour-Piercing Discarding Sabot (APDS) rounds, which would match the penetration of the 'Littlejohn' shot while still allowing high-explosive (HE) shells to be fired. Development of this gun was also abandoned when the role of the Saladin shifted towards infantry fire support, and a low-velocity 76 mm gun was selected for it instead.

Initially one of the most serious shortcomings of the 2-pdr was the lack of a high-explosive shell, especially when the 2-pdr was the main gun of a tank; this was very important when a tank was being used for infantry support, leaving it with only its machine gun for anti-personnel use. A high-explosive shell was not produced until late 1942.

Service history 

The 2-pdr gun became a part of the Royal Artillery in 1938, when five field brigades were converted to anti-tank regiments. In the early western campaigns, the 2-pdr was employed by two types of Royal Artillery formations: anti-tank regiments of infantry divisions (four batteries with 12 pieces each), and light anti-aircraft/anti-tank regiments of armoured divisions (two 12-gun AT batteries). From October 1940, separate 48-gun anti-tank regiments were introduced in armoured divisions too. Infantry brigade structure initially included an anti-tank company, though it was typically equipped with 25 mm Hotchkiss anti-tank guns; these companies were disbanded later in the war. From 1942, infantry battalions received their own six-gun anti-tank platoons. The organization was different in the Far East theatres. The exact internal structure of AT units was also subject to changes and variations.

The gun first saw combat with the British Expeditionary Force (World War II) during the German invasion of the Low Countries and the subsequent rear-guard actions at Dunkirk. Most of the British Army's 2-pdrs were left behind in France during the retreat, stripping most of the army's infantry anti-tank capability. Those guns captured at Dunkirk entered German service under the designation 4.0 cm Pak 192 (e) or 4.0 cm Pak 154 (b), the "e" and "b" referring to the origin (English or mistakenly attributed to the Belgian Army).

Although Woolwich Arsenal had already designed a successor to the 2-pdr, the 6 pounder gun, it was decided in the face of a possible German invasion to re-equip the army with the 2-pdr, avoiding the period of adaptation to production, and also of re-training and acclimatization with the new weapon. Consequently, 6 pounder production was delayed until November 1941 and frontline availability until spring 1942. Thus during most of the North African Campaign the army had to rely on the 2-pdr, augmented by the 25 pounder gun-howitzer functioning as an anti-tank gun—a role for which it was capable (at the expense of diverting it from its main artillery role). As German tank design evolved, anti-armour performance of the 2-pdr gradually became insufficient; however, the gun owes a large part of the bad reputation it gained during the campaign to the open terrain, which made the high-silhouette piece hard to conceal, and to poor tactics.

In North Africa, it was found that the 2-pdr was damaged by being towed long distances across rough, stony deserts. Starting in 1941, the British developed the "en portee" method of mounting the 2-pdr, and later the 6-pounder, on a truck. Though only intended for transport, with the gun carried unloaded, crews tended to fire from their vehicles for more mobility, with consequent casualties. Hence the vehicles tended to reverse into action so that the gunshield of the 2-pdr would provide a measure of protection against enemy fire. An infantry battalion anti-tank platoon would have eight guns on 3-ton lorries On 21 November 1941 during battle of Sidi Rezegh Second lieutenant George Ward Gunn J Battery Royal Horse Artillery was earned the Victoria Cross for his action with a 2-pdr. The troop of four portee 2-pdrs under his command engaged a German counter-attack of about 60 tanks. Three of the guns were knocked out, and all bar one gunner killed or fatally wounded. Despite the truck being on fire, Gunn manned the gun himself with a sergeant as his loader, engaging the enemy at 800 yards, he fired 40-50 rounds knocking out two tanks and damaging others before he was killed. The battery commander then took over.

From mid-1942, the 2-pdr was increasingly displaced to infantry anti-tank platoons, to Home Guard units in Great Britain, and to the Far East, where it was still effective against the smaller and more lightly armoured Japanese tanks. It was finally removed from service entirely in December 1945. As a vehicle weapon, it remained in use throughout the war. Although most tanks equipped with it were withdrawn or upgraded to the 6-pdr, it remained in use with armoured cars.

Its performance as an anti-armour weapon was improved later in the war with the development of more sophisticated ammunition and got an additional boost with the introduction of the Littlejohn adaptor, which converted it to a squeeze-bore design firing specially-designed shells at much higher velocities. However, the Littlejohn adaptor prevented the use of High Explosive rounds. These improvements, however, were constantly outpaced by improvements in tank design.

As a tank gun, used stationary the effective range was out to 1500 yds.

Ammunition

Variants
Gun variants:
Mk IX - main pre-war production version, with barrel of autofrettage construction.
Mk IX-A - Mk IX simplified for mass production.
Mk X - later production version, with forged barrel.
Mk X-A - Mk X with dimension tolerances reduced.
Mk X-B - main late-war vehicle version, fitted with the Littlejohn adaptor.
Carriage variants:
Mk I - Carriage designed by Vickers.
Mk II - Carriage designed by the Royal Arsenal.

Self-propelled mounts

Tanks
Light Tank Mk VII, Tetrarch
Light Tank Mk VIII, Harry Hopkins
Cruiser Tank Mk I 
Cruiser Tank Mk II
Cruiser Tank Mk III
Cruiser Tank Mk V, Covenanter
Cruiser Tank Mk VI, Crusader - MkI and Mk II
Infantry Tank Mk II, Matilda
Infantry Tank Mk III, Valentine - Marks I to VII
Infantry Tank Mk IV, Churchill - Mk I and Mk II
Ram I (Canada)
AC1 Sentinel (Australia)
Armoured cars
AEC Armoured Car - Mk I
Coventry Armoured Car
Daimler Armoured Car
Marmon-Herrington Armoured Car (South Africa) - Mk IV, and Mk VI prototype
Rhino Heavy Armoured Car (Australia, prototype only)
Other vehicles
2 Pounder Anti-tank Gun Carrier (Australia, used for training)
Loyd Carrier (experimental)

Surviving examples
There is an Irish Army QF 2 pdr in the museum in Collins Barracks in Dublin City.
Another QF 2 pdr is on display at the Canadian Military Heritage Museum in Brantford Ontario Canada.
Two guns, one of them on an improvised carriage, are on display in the IDF History Museum (Batey HaOsef) in Tel Aviv, Israel.
An Australian-made QF 2 pdr is on display at the Australian War Memorial.

See also
QF 2 pounder naval gun "pom-pom" AA gun, of the same bore but with a pre-World War I heritage.
British standard ordnance weights and measurements
37 mm gun M3, contemporary US equivalent
45 mm anti-tank gun M1937 (53-K) 
45 mm anti-tank gun M1932 (19-K)
45 mm anti-tank gun M1942 (M-42), contemporary Soviet equivalents
Type 94 37 mm anti-tank gun
Type 1 37 mm anti-tank gun
25 mm Hotchkiss anti-tank gun
Bofors 37 mm anti-tank gun

Notes

References
Notes

Bibliography

Further reading

External links

2-pdr at WWII Online

Field artillery
40 mm artillery
World War II artillery of the United Kingdom
World War II tank guns
Tank guns of the United Kingdom
World War II anti-tank guns
Vickers
Military equipment introduced in the 1930s